Mascota volcanic field is a volcanic field in Mexico. Several other volcanic fields lie in the neighbourhood.

Volcanism in the Mascota volcanic field occurs within a complicated tectonic context. The Jalisco block is bordered by two rift zones and one subduction zone.

The Mascota volcanic field is the youngest occurrence of minettes identified on Earth, with the most recent dates being about 70,000 ± 80,000 years ago. The youngest eruption of the field may have occurred less than 5,600 years ago.

Geography and geomorphology 

The landscape is dominated by mountains and by flat valleys that support agriculture. Dirt roads from Puerto Vallarta and a highway constructed in 1993 from Guadalajara lead into the area.

The Mascota volcanic field is formed by a number of cinder cones and lava domes. The cones are vegetated, which contrast with the relatively scarce vegetation of the Cretaceous surrounding terrain.

The Rio Mascota and Rio Talpa cross the field. Aside from the town of Mascota, Talpa de Allende is another settlement in the southwestern part of the field. East of the Mascota volcanic field lies the wider Atenguillo graben, which has a number of volcanic fields associated with. North of Mascota the San Sebastian volcanic field is older than Mascota and may be associated with the Tepic rift.

Geology 

The field lies within the Jalisco tectonic block. Two grabens cut tuffs of Cretaceous age in the area and the Mascota field has developed in these grabens, with the exception of a group of cones farther north which probably formed on a fault.

This part of Mexico is in a complex tectonic regimen. Starting 14 million years ago, extension across the present-day Gulf of California commenced. Extension further occurred during the Pleistocene in the adjacent Mexican mainland in the Tepic-Zacoalco rift, which separates the Jalisco block from the Sierra Madre Occidental, and the Colima rift zone with its probable submarine extension, the Manzanillo canyon. Volcanism and earthquake activity is still ongoing in these rift zones today, forming for example Ceboruco and Volcan Colima which is Mexico's most active volcano. These two rift zones together with the Middle America Trench delimit the Jalisco block.

At the same time, the Rivera Plate subducts beneath the Jalisco block, causing earthquakes such as the 1932 Mexico earthquake. Farther south, the Rivera Plate is bordered by the Cocos Plate which is also subducting beneath Mexico. The relatively oblique subduction of the Cocos Plate may be responsible for the Colima graben, while another theory postulates that the Colima graben is an extension of the East Pacific Rise. The Riviera Plate is a remnant of the Farallon Plate.

Composition 

The field is known for having erupted many disparate types of rocks. Volcanic rocks which have been observed include absarokite, andesite, basaltic andesite, hornblende-lamprophyre, minette and spessartite. Basaltic andesite and minette form about 50% of all exposed rocks. Part of this diversity may reflect different classifications of the rocks rather than actual chemical differences, however. Such a variety of volcanic rocks has been found at the adjacent volcanic fields of Ayutla, Los Volcanes and Tapalpa.

As a plate subducts and sinks into the mantle, it loses water to the abovelying mantle wedge. This water also transports material from the subducting slab into the mantle wedge, modifying its chemistry. The melting of this modified mantle wedge appears to be the source of Mascota magmas, albeit with some magmas being modified by interactions with the crust.

Minettes of the Mascota volcanic field are the world's youngest. Potassium-argon dating has yielded ages of 70,000 ± 80,000 years ago for these.

Eruptive history 

Little is known about the eruption ages of the Mascota field. The minettes have been dated by potassium-argon dating, with ages obtained between 1,93 million years ago and 68,000 years ago. A very low magma output of  has been determined.

The youngest eruption occurred at Malpais volcano. A basaltic andesite lava flow with little plant and no soil cover was formed there. The eruption may have occurred only a few thousand years ago, less than 5,600 years ago of scoria in neighbouring lakes comes from this eruption.

References

Sources 

 
 

Volcanoes of Jalisco
Pleistocene volcanoes
Holocene volcanoes
Volcanic fields